Olav Sorenson is an American sociologist, currently the Joseph Jacobs Chair in Entrepreneurial Studies; Professor of Strategy and the Faculty Research Director, Price Center for Entrepreneurship & Innovation at the UCLA Anderson School of Management.

References

Year of birth missing (living people)
Living people
Yale School of Management faculty
American sociologists
Stanford University alumni
Harvard University alumni